The Cyprus national rugby sevens team competes in the FIRA-AER European sevens. They have only played for 2 seasons. In their first season of the 2008 competition they managed to compete with the First and Third Tier sevens teams by defeating Georgia 7-5 and drawing 7–7 with Italy. Their second season saw them finish 12th out of 30 teams, just 2 places off qualifying for the final tournament held in Germany. In just their third year of sevens rugby, Cyprus hosted the final stage of the FIRA-AER European Sevens, this was held in Paphos on 12 and 13 June 2010.

FIRA-AER European Sevens

2008-09 Squad
10-man squad:

2010 squad
12-man squad: Bucharest and Paphos Sevens

Coaches
Mark Walboyoff (head coach)
Paul Shanks (assistant coach)
Carlton Douglas

References

External links

Cyprus Rugby Federation
Paphos Tigers - Member of Cyprus Rugby Federation
 Limassol Crusaders RFC

Rugby
Rugby union in Cyprus
Cypriot rugby union teams
National rugby sevens teams